Magnification is the process of enlarging the apparent size, not physical size, of something. This enlargement is quantified by a calculated number also called "magnification". When this number is less than one, it refers to a reduction in size, sometimes called magnification or de-magnification.

Typically, magnification is related to scaling up visuals or images to be able to see more detail, increasing resolution, using microscope, printing techniques, or digital processing. In all cases, the magnification of the image does not change the perspective of the image.

Examples of magnification
Some optical instruments provide visual aid by magnifying small or distant subjects.

 A magnifying glass, which uses a positive (convex) lens to make things look bigger by allowing the user to hold them closer to their eye.
 A telescope, which uses its large objective lens or primary mirror to create an image of a distant object and then allows the user to examine the image closely with a smaller eyepiece lens, thus making the object look larger.

 A microscope, which makes a small object appear as a much larger image at a comfortable distance for viewing. A microscope is similar in layout to a telescope except that the object being viewed is close to the objective, which is usually much smaller than the eyepiece.
 A slide projector, which projects a large image of a small slide on a screen. A photographic enlarger is similar.

Magnification as a number (optical magnification)
Optical magnification is the ratio between the apparent size of an object (or its size in an image) and its true size, and thus it is a dimensionless number. Optical magnification is sometimes referred to as "power" (for example "10× power"), although this can lead to confusion with optical power.

Linear or Transverse magnification
For real images, such as images projected on a screen, size means a linear dimension (measured, for example, in millimeters or inches).

Angular magnification
For optical instruments with an eyepiece, the linear dimension of the image seen in the eyepiece (virtual image at infinite distance) cannot be given, thus size means the angle subtended by the object at the focal point (angular size). Strictly speaking, one should take the tangent of that angle (in practice, this makes a difference only if the angle is larger than a few degrees). Thus, angular magnification is given by:

For example, the mean angular size of the Moon's disk as viewed from Earth's surface is about 0.52°. Thus, through binoculars with 10× magnification, the Moon appears to subtend an angle of about 5.2°.

By convention, for magnifying glasses and optical microscopes, where the size of the object is a linear dimension and the apparent size is an angle, the magnification is the ratio between the apparent (angular) size as seen in the eyepiece and the angular size of the object when placed at the conventional closest distance of distinct vision: 25 cm from the eye.

By instrument

Single lens
The linear magnification of a thin lens is

Note that for real images,  is negative and the image is inverted. For virtual images,  is positive and the image is upright.

With  being the distance from the lens to the image,  the height of the image and  the height of the object, the magnification can also be written as:

Note again that a negative magnification implies an inverted image.

Photography
The image recorded by a photographic film or image sensor is always a real image and is usually inverted. When measuring the height of an inverted image using the cartesian sign convention (where the x-axis is the optical axis) the value for hi will be negative, and as a result M will also be negative. However, the traditional sign convention used in photography is "real is positive, virtual is negative". Therefore, in photography: Object height and distance are always real and positive. When the focal length is positive the image's height, distance and magnification are real and positive. Only if the focal length is negative, the image's height, distance and magnification are virtual and negative. Therefore, the photographic magnification formulae are traditionally presented as 

In Photography, magnification rate often present in 1X, 2X, etc. Or sometimes would be in form of ratio(0.5:1, 1:1, 2:1, etc.). Same lens may react different in magnification rate when using different sensors.

Magnifying glass
The maximum angular magnification (compared to the naked eye) of a magnifying glass depends on how the glass and the object are held, relative to the eye. If the lens is held at a distance from the object such that its front focal point is on the object being viewed, the relaxed eye (focused to infinity) can view the image with angular magnification

Here,  is the focal length of the lens in centimeters. The constant 25 cm is an estimate of the "near point" distance of the eye—the closest distance at which the healthy naked eye can focus. In this case the angular magnification is independent from the distance kept between the eye and the magnifying glass.

If instead the lens is held very close to the eye and the object is placed closer to the lens than its focal point so that the observer focuses on the near point, a larger angular magnification can be obtained, approaching

A different interpretation of the working of the latter case is that the magnifying glass changes the diopter of the eye (making it myopic) so that the object can be placed closer to the eye resulting in a larger angular magnification.

Microscope
The angular magnification of a microscope is given by

where  is the magnification of the objective and  the magnification of the eyepiece. The magnification of the objective depends on its focal length  and on the distance  between objective back focal plane and the focal plane of the eyepiece (called the tube length):

The magnification of the eyepiece depends upon its focal length  and is calculated by the same equation as that of a magnifying glass (above).

Note that both astronomical telescopes as well as simple microscopes produce an inverted image, thus the equation for the magnification of a telescope or microscope is often given with a minus sign.

Telescope
The angular magnification of an optical telescope is given by

Measurement of telescope magnification
Measuring the actual angular magnification of a telescope is difficult, but it is possible to use the reciprocal relationship between the linear magnification and the angular magnification, since the linear magnification is constant for all objects.

The telescope is focused correctly for viewing objects at the distance for which the angular magnification is to be determined and then the object glass is used as an object the image of which is known as the exit pupil. The diameter of this may be measured using an instrument known as a Ramsden dynameter which consists of a Ramsden eyepiece with micrometer hairs in the back focal plane. This is mounted in front of the telescope eyepiece and used to evaluate the diameter of the exit pupil. This will be much smaller than the object glass diameter, which gives the linear magnification (actually a reduction), the angular magnification can be determined from
.

Maximum usable magnification
With any telescope or microscope, or a lens
a maximum magnification exists beyond which the image looks bigger but shows no more detail.  It occurs when the finest detail the instrument can resolve is magnified to match the finest detail the eye can see.  Magnification beyond this maximum is sometimes called "empty magnification".

For a good quality telescope operating in good atmospheric conditions, the maximum usable magnification is limited by diffraction.  In practice it is considered to be 2× the aperture in millimetres or 50× the aperture in inches; so, a 60mm diameter telescope has a maximum usable magnification of 120×.

With an optical microscope having a high numerical aperture and using oil immersion, the best possible resolution is 200 nm corresponding to a magnification of around 1200×. Without oil immersion, the maximum usable magnification is around 800×.  For details, see limitations of optical microscopes.

Small, cheap telescopes and microscopes are sometimes supplied with the eyepieces that give magnification far higher than is usable.

"Magnification" of displayed images

Magnification figures on pictures displayed in print or online can be misleading.  Editors of journals and magazines routinely resize images to fit the page, making any magnification number provided in the figure legend incorrect. Images displayed on a computer screen change size based on the size of the screen.  A scale bar (or micron bar) is a bar of stated length superimposed on a picture. When the picture is resized the bar will be resized in proportion.  If a picture has a scale bar, the actual magnification can easily be calculated.  Where the scale (magnification) of an image is important or relevant, including a scale bar is preferable to stating magnification.

See also 
 Lens
 Magnifying glass
 Microscope
 Optical telescope
 Screen magnifier

References

Optics
Articles containing video clips